Odessa massacre may refer to

Odessa pogroms
1941 Odessa massacre
2014 Odesa clashes